The Minnesota Brass Drum and Bugle Corps is an all-age drum and bugle corps based in St. Paul, Minnesota, United States, that competes in Drum Corps Associates (DCA). A consistent DCA Finalist, Minnesota Brass was the 2011 DCA Open Class World Champion.

History
Minnesota Brass was founded in 1946 as the Cecil Kyle Legion Corps. Between the years of 1946 and 1968 the corps operated under the names of William Laidlaw Legion Corps, Laidlaw Toreadors, Grain Belt Diamonds, and Men of Laidlaw. In 1969, the organization became a self-supporting non-profit under the name of Brass, Inc. In 1980, the organization adopted the name Minnesota Brass, Inc.

Today, Minnesota Brass, Inc. is a non-profit performing arts organization based in St. Paul, Minnesota that operates five separate performing ensembles: Minnesota Brass (all-age drum and bugle corps), Minne-Brass (mini-corps), MBI Winter Guard, and Minnesota Brass Indoor Drum Line.

The all-age drum and bugle corps is the largest and most well known of the organization's ensembles.  The corps performs under the name "Minnesota Brass."  Friends and fans sometimes refer to it informally as simply "Brass" or "MBI."  The more formal "Minnesota Brass Inc." name is now used rarely and only to refer to the organization as a whole.

The corps has competed in the Drum Corps Associates (DCA) World Championships 34 times since 1973 and has placed in the top ten in Open Class competition every year since 1991, the second longest streak behind the Hawthorne Caballeros Drum and Bugle Corps. In 2011, Minnesota Brass won its first DCA Open Class World Championship title.

At its August 2018 meeting, the board of directors of Minnesota Brass (MBI) voted to pursue an all-age drum and bugle corps to compete during the 2019 summer season.

Management
Minnesota Brass Incorporated  ("MBI") is the corporate entity that manages the Minnesota Brass Drum & Bugle Corps and other performing ensembles.  The organization's management team is:
 Gavin Burnham - President and CEO
 Katy Matuzak - Executive Director
 Dave Whitaker - Chief Financial Officer

Performing Ensembles
 Minnesota Brass Drum & Bugle Corps
 Minnesota Brass Indoor Drum Line
 Minnesota Brass Indoor Winter Guard
 Minnesota Brass Indoor Winds
 Minne-Brass

Awards
DCA World Champions: 2011

DCA Mini-Corps Champions: 1999, 2005 (Minne-Brass)

DCA Colorguard Champions: 2011

DCA Horn Line Champions: 2010, 2011, 2015

DCA Frontline Champions: 2001, 2004, 2005

DCA Percussion Champions: 2003, 2004, 2010, 2013

Past Shows

Editors Note: This list is currently under construction. Formatting is being renovated. Thank you!

Gold background indicates DCA Open Class Championship; pale blue background indicates DCA Open Class Finalist

References

External links 
 

Drum Corps Associates corps
Hennepin County, Minnesota
Culture of Saint Paul, Minnesota
Musical groups established in 1946

Arts organizations based in Saint Paul, Minnesota
1946 establishments in Minnesota